The FIL World Luge Natural Track Championships 2005 took place in Latsch, Italy.

Men's singles

Women's singles

Men's doubles

Mixed team

Medal table

References
Men's doubles natural track World Champions
Men's singles natural track World Champions
Mixed teams natural track World Champions
Women's singles natural track World Champions

FIL World Luge Natural Track Championships
2005 in luge
2002 in Italian sport
Luge in Italy